The 2013 Campeonato Paraense de Futebol was the 101st edition of Pará's top professional football league. The competition began in November 10, 2012 and ended on May 12, 2013. Paysandu won the championship by the 45th time, while Abaeté and Bragantino were relegated due to withdrawing.

Format
The competition has three stages. On the First stage, 8 teams play a single round-robin. The two teams with the worst campaign on this stage are relegated to the state's second division. Due to the withdrawal of Abaeté and Bragantino, both teams were relegated.

On the Second stage, there are two rounds. Each round is a round-robin. The four best teams in each round advances to a playoff, so the winner of the round can be found.

On the Final stage, each round winner plays in the final. If the same team wins both round, that team is the champion.

The champion, the runner-up and the 3rd-placed team qualify to the 2014 Copa do Brasil. The best team who isn't on Campeonato Brasileiro Série A, Série B or Série C qualifies to Série D.

Participating teams

First stage

Second stage

First stage (Taça ACLEP)

Abaeté and Bragantino were relegated due to withdrawing.

Results

Second stage

First round (Taça Cidade de Belém)

Standings

Results

Playoffs

Semifinals

First leg

Second leg

Finals

Paysandu won the First round and Taça Cidade de Belém.

Second round (Taça Estado do Pará)

Standings

Results

Playoffs

Semifinals

First leg

Second leg

Finals

Paragominas won the Second round and Taça Estado do Pará.

Final stage

Paysandu won the 2013 Campeonato Paraense.

References

Paraense
2013